Marshalls plc is a United Kingdom based manufacturer of natural stone and concrete hard landscaping products, supplying the construction, home improvement and landscape markets. It is based in Elland, West Yorkshire. It is listed on the London Stock Exchange, and is a constituent of the FTSE 250 Index.

History 
The company was established by Solomon Marshall in 1890. The company acquired Stancliffe Stone for £10 million in June 2001. Marshalls was acknowledged as a Superbrand for the eighth year running in 2017. Marshalls acquired roof manufacturer Marley for £535 million in April 2022.

Operations
The company is also a manufacturer and supplier of water management systems, street furniture and landscape protection products. It operates its own quarries and manufacturing sites in the United Kingdom. It also operates Marshalls NV in Belgium, covering Benelux and Northern France.

The Marshalls Register of approved Landscape Contractors and Driveway Installers is a national network of over 1,150 recommended professionals.  Although the contractors are not employed by Marshalls, they agree to abide by the Marshalls installation guidelines and are vetted by Marshalls assessors. The network has an annual awards ceremony.

References

External links
Official site
Yahoo profile

Manufacturing companies of the United Kingdom
Companies listed on the London Stock Exchange
Companies based in Elland